Audrey Pellew Hylton-Foster, Baroness Hylton-Foster DBE (née Brown; 19 May 1908 – 31 October 2002),  was the daughter of Douglas Clifton Brown, 1st Viscount Ruffside, and Violet Cicely Kathleen Wollaston. She married Sir Harry Braustyn Hylton-Foster, who had started a distinguished career at the Bar in 1931; they had no children.

Born in Simla, India, she was educated at St George's, Ascot, and Ivy House, Wimbledon. Both her father and husband served as Speaker of the House of Commons.

Red Cross work
Audrey Hylton-Foster first lived at Speaker's House during her father's time there, when she went to recover from measles. While she was convalescing she started working for the British Red Cross, and this, apart from politics, became her life's work.

During World War II she was a nurse at St Luke's Hospital, Chelsea. She cycled thousands of miles around London on her Red Cross duties. In 1950 she became director of the Chelsea division of the British Red Cross. She was at various times president, chairman and patron of the London branch. In late 1980 she was acting as consultant at the national headquarters.

Politics
Her husband began his political career after World War II. He lost his first try at a seat in the House of Commons for the Shipley constituency in 1945. By 1950 he was Member of Parliament (MP) for York. In 1951 and 1955 his majorities were slim; however, in 1959, after changing constituencies, his majority was a very healthy 17,000.

After her husband's death in office in 1965, she was created a life peer as Baroness Hylton-Foster, of the City of Westminster on 7 December 1965. Despite her prior objections to women politicians, she became an active member of the House of Lords, and for many years served as Convenor of the Crossbench peers. She was appointed a Dame Commander of the Order of the British Empire (DBE) in the 1990 Birthday Honours.

Post-politics

Audrey Hylton-Foster lived in a converted Coach House on Leith Hill in Surrey. Each year she decided to open her gardens to the public, in order to raise money for various charities. One year, with help from actress Virginia McKenna, a substantial amount was raised for the Born Free Foundation.

She was a passionate gardener in her later years and would be out in her garden in all weathers right up until her death. The Garden Open Day raised funds for a number of good causes including the British Red Cross, Cancer Research, local schools etc. All supported by her loyal staff Mr and Mrs Pinchin.

Honourable Lady Hylton-Foster's Annuity Act 1965

The Honourable Lady Hylton-Foster's Annuity Act 1965 provided an annuity (essentially, a pension) to Audrey Hylton-Foster for the rest of her life.

It was granted in consideration of the service provided by her husband, Sir Harry Hylton-Foster, as Speaker of the House of Commons between October 1959 and September 1965, when he died in office.

Baroness Hylton-Foster herself died on 31 October 2002, and consequently the Act was repealed in 2004.

Death
She died on 31 October 2002, at her home, aged 94.

References

External links
Obituary

1908 births
2002 deaths
Anglo-Indian people
Red Cross personnel
Crossbench life peers
Wives of knights
Dames Commander of the Order of the British Empire
Daughters of viscounts
Life peeresses created by Elizabeth II
People from Surrey
20th-century British women politicians
20th-century British philanthropists
Hylton-Foster